Richard John Hounslow (born 19 December 1981) is a British slalom canoeist who competed at the international level from 1999 until his retirement in 2016. He started out as a specialist in the kayak (K1) category, but in 2009 he also started competing in canoe doubles (C2) alongside David Florence. In his last season (2016) he concentrated on the C2 class exclusively.

Personal and early life
Hounslow was born in the London Borough of Harrow, which he represented in the London Youth Games. He attended Harrow College. He was inducted into the London Youth Games Hall of Fame in 2012. Outside of canoeing, Hounslow is a Tottenham Hotspur supporter.

Career  
At the 2012 Summer Olympics in London he won a silver medal in the C2 event and placed 12th in the K1 event. He won another silver medal in the C2 event at the 2016 Summer Olympics in Rio de Janeiro.

Hounslow won nine medals at the ICF Canoe Slalom World Championships with a gold (C2: 2013), a silver (K1 team: 2009) and seven bronzes (C2: 2010; C2 team: 2009, 2011, 2013, 2015; K1 team: 2014, 2015). He also won 9 medals at the European Championships (2 golds, 3 silvers and 4 bronzes).

In 2012, Hounslow won the C2 gold at the World Cup race in Cardiff along with David Florence.

World Cup individual podiums

References

External links

2010 ICF Canoe Slalom World Championships 11 September 2010 C2 men's final results – Retrieved 11 September 2010.
12 September 2009 final results for the men's C2 team slalom event for the 2009 ICF Canoe Slalom World Championships. – Retrieved 12 September 2009.
12 September 2009 final results for the men's K1 team event at the 2009 ICF Canoe Slalom World Championships. – Retrieved 12 September 2009.

English male canoeists
Canoeists at the 2012 Summer Olympics
Canoeists at the 2016 Summer Olympics
Living people
Olympic canoeists of Great Britain
Olympic medalists in canoeing
Olympic silver medallists for Great Britain
1981 births
Medalists at the 2012 Summer Olympics
Medalists at the 2016 Summer Olympics
People from Harrow, London
British male canoeists
Medalists at the ICF Canoe Slalom World Championships